Uffington and Barnack was a railway station in the Soke of Peterborough (now Cambridgeshire) serving the villages of Uffington, Barnack and Bainton.

History
The station was on the Midland Railway's Syston and Peterborough Railway from Peterborough to Leicester and was situated to the east of a level crossing on the road between Uffington and Barnack. It opened in 1846 and closed to passengers in 1952 and to goods in 1964.

To the west of the level crossing was a signal box and a single goods siding. The goods yard is now used as a car park by the signalman and sometimes by track maintenance crews. The signal box is still in use and is a block post with the adjacent signal boxes being Peterborough and Ketton, Stamford signal box having been abolished in 1983. Unusually, the level crossing gates are still opened and closed manually by the signalman.

Between 1867 and 1929, Barnack was also served by the Barnack station on the Great Northern Railway line between Stamford East and Wansford. The station was more conveniently sited, but Uffington & Barnack provided the more useful services.

There was also at one time a station on the Midland line at Bainton, called Bainton Gate, but this closed in 1856.

The station house has survived and is now a private house.

Summary of former services

Sample train timetable for July 1922 
The table below shows the train departures from Uffington & Barnack station on weekdays in July 1922.

References

External links
 Uffington and Barnack station on navigable 1946 O. S.map

Disused railway stations in Cambridgeshire
Transport in Peterborough
Buildings and structures in Peterborough
Railway stations in Great Britain opened in 1846
Railway stations in Great Britain closed in 1952
Former Midland Railway stations
Barnack